No Blues is the fifth studio album by Welsh indie rock band Los Campesinos!. The album was produced by John Goodmanson and the band's guitarist, Tom Bromley. It is the band's first album without founding bassist Ellen Waddell, who amicably left the group in late 2012.

The album was released on 29 October 2013 on Wichita Recordings, Turnstile Music and Heart Swells. It is the band's first album not to be distributed in North America by Arts & Crafts Productions.

The first single, "What Death Leaves Behind", was released as a free download on the band's SoundCloud page on 29 August 2013. The second single, "Avocado, Baby", was released on 8 October 2013.

Reception

Initial critical response was positive. At Metacritic, which assigns a normalized rating out of 100 to reviews from mainstream critics, the album has received an average score of 79, based on 17 reviews. The A.V. Club named the album the 18th best album of 2013 in their annual year-end list.

Track listing
All songs written by Gareth Paisey.

 "For Floatsam" – 3:43
 "What Death Leaves Behind" – 3:37
 "A Portrait of the Trequartista as a Young Man" – 3:01
 "Cemetery Gaits" – 4:52
 "Glue Me" – 5:04
 "As Lucerne/The Low" – 4:22
 "Avocado, Baby" – 4:36
 "Let It Spill" – 3:20
 "The Time Before the Last Time" – 2:47
 "Selling Rope (Swan Dive to Estuary)" – 6:17

Personnel
Musicians

 Los Campesinos!, notably:
 Gareth Paisey – writing, vocals
 Tom Bromley – guitar, brass arrangements, string arrangements
 Michael Iles – trumpet
 Craig Walker – trombone
 Phillip Peterson – strings
 Cardiff Cougar Allstars Cheerleaders – vocals

Technical

 Tom Bromley – producing
 John Goodmanson – producing, mixing
 Mazen Murad – mastering

Promotional

 Michael Barrow – photography
 Rob Taylor – art direction, album design

References

2013 albums
Los Campesinos! albums
Wichita Recordings albums